"The Lucky One" is the first single from bluegrass artist, Alison Krauss' album, New Favorite. The first of three singles released, this song was the only one to chart. It re-charted and peaked at number 46 on the U.S., in 2003. Billboard Hot Country Songs chart—her biggest chart hit since "When You Say Nothing at All" hit number three in 1995. The song also won a Grammy for Best Country Performance by a Duo or Group with Vocal as well as Best Country Song.

A music video was filmed and released prior to the release of the song.

Chart performance

References

2001 singles
Alison Krauss songs
Rounder Records singles
2001 songs
Songs written by Robert Lee Castleman